The Monte Carlo trolley, or FERMIAC, was an analog computer invented by physicist Enrico Fermi to aid in his studies of neutron transport.

Operation 

The FERMIAC employed the Monte Carlo method to model neutron transport in various types of nuclear systems. Given an initial distribution of neutrons, the goal of the process is to develop numerous "neutron genealogies", or models of the behavior of individual neutrons, including each collision, scattering, and fission.  When a fission occurs, the number of emerging neutrons is predicted, and the behavior of each of these neutrons is eventually modeled in the same manner as the first.  At each stage, pseudo-random numbers are used to make decisions that affect the behavior of each neutron.

The FERMIAC used this method to create two-dimensional neutron genealogies on a scale diagram of a nuclear device.  A series of drums on the device were set according to the material being crossed and a random choice between fast and slow neutrons.  Random numbers also determined the direction of travel and the distance until the next collision.  Once the drums were set, the trolley was rolled across the diagram, drawing a path as it went.  Any time a change in material was indicated on the diagram, the drum settings were adjusted accordingly before continuing.

History 

In the early 1930s, Italian physicist Enrico Fermi led a team of young scientists, dubbed the "Via Panisperna boys", in their now-famous experiments in nuclear physics. During this time, Fermi developed "statistical sampling" techniques that he effectively employed to predict the results of experiments.

Years later, in 1946, Fermi participated in the initial review of results from the ENIAC. Among the others present was Los Alamos mathematician Stanislaw Ulam, who was familiar with the use of statistical sampling techniques similar to those previously developed by Fermi. Such techniques had mainly fallen out of use, due to the long, repetitious calculations required. However, given ENIAC's powers of calculation, Ulam saw an opportunity to resurrect these techniques.  He discussed his ideas with John von Neumann, who eventually used the ENIAC to implement the Monte Carlo method (as the statistical sampling techniques came to be called) to solve a variety of neutron transport problems.

However, before the ENIAC could be employed for this purpose, it first had to be moved to its permanent home at the Ballistics Research Laboratory. It was during this interruption in ENIAC operation that Fermi came up with the idea for his analog device.  He enlisted his colleague L.D.P. King to build the instrument, which was later given the fitting name FERMIAC. The device was used for approximately two years. The Fermiac is on display in the Bradbury Science Museum in Los Alamos.

In 2015, the Museo Storico della Fisica e Centro Studi e Ricerche “Enrico Fermi” created a replica of the device. A presentation of the device by Coccetti et al. is available as PDF.

See also 
 Planimeter
Neutrons
Nuclear fission
Computer simulation

Further articles 
What is the FERMIAC or Fermi Trolley? by The Bradbury Science Museum is operated by Los Alamos National Laboratory for education, 2017

References 

Early computers
Analog computers
Enrico Fermi